Prebreza is a village in the municipality of Blace, Serbia.

The Prebreza paleontological site is regarded an important European mammalian site of the Middle Miocene.

References

Populated places in Toplica District
Prehistoric sites in Serbia
Miocene paleontological sites
Nature reserves in Serbia
Paleontology in Serbia